Talışnuru (also, Talysh”-Nuri and Talyshnuru) is a village and municipality in the Shamakhi Rayon of Azerbaijan.  It has a population of 315.

References 

Populated places in Shamakhi District